The year 1920 in architecture involved some significant events.

Events
 Construction of Welwyn Garden City in England begins with Louis de Soissons as architect and town planner.
 Edith Hughes establishes her own architectural practice, in Glasgow, the first British woman to do so.
 In the first issue of the Purist art magazine L' Esprit Nouveau co-founded by him, Charles-Édouard Jeanneret-Gris adopts the pseudonym Le Corbusier.

Buildings and structures

Buildings opened
 November 11 – The Cenotaph, Whitehall, London, designed by Edwin Lutyens.

Buildings completed
 Ajuria Enea, Vitoria-Gasteiz, Spain, designed by Alfredo Baeschlin.
 Coliseum Theatre (Kuala Lumpur), Malaysia.
 Hartford Times Building, Hartford, Connecticut, designed by Donn Barber
 Manitoba Legislative Building in Winnipeg, Manitoba, Canada.
 Oak Tower, Downtown Kansas City, Missouri, USA.
 Oslo Synagogue, Norway.
 Teatro Municipal (Lima), Peru.
 Bankstown Reservoir in Sydney, Australia

Awards
 AIA Gold Medal – Egerton Swartwout
 Olympic silver medal – Holger Sinding-Larsen of Norway for Project for a gymnastics school (no other medals awarded)
 RIBA Royal Gold Medal – Charles Louis Girault
 Grand Prix de Rome, architecture: Michel Roux-Spitz

Births
 January 23 – Gottfried Böhm, German architect (died 2021)
 July 16 – Peter Yates, English architect (died 1982)
 August 21 – Vincent Scully, American architectural historian (died 2017)
 September 2 – Romaldo Giurgola, Italian-American-Australian academic architect, professor and author (died 2016)
 October 21 – William Whitfield, English architect (died 2019)
 December 28 – Bruce McCarty, American architect (died 2013)

Deaths
 March 12 – Hermann Eggert, German architect (born 1888)
 May 17 – Jean-Louis Pascal, academic French architect (born 1837)
 May 18 – Frank Matcham, English theatrical architect and designer (born 1854)
 July 31 – Thomas Tryon, American architect (born 1859)
 October 22 – Ruggero Berlam, Italian architect (born 1854)

References